Jainagar is a village and gram panchayat in the Jainagar CD block in the Koderma subdivision of  the Koderma district in the Indian state of Jharkhand.

Geography

Location                               

Overview
Koderma district is plateau territory and around 60% of the total area is covered with forests. The first dam of the Damodar Valley Corporation, at Tilaiya, was built across the Barakar River and inaugurated in 1953. Koderma Junction railway station has emerged as an important railway centre in the region. It is a predominantly rural district with only 19.72% urban population.

Note: The map alongside presents some of the notable locations in the district. All places marked in the map are linked in the larger full screen map.

Demographics
According to the 2011 Census of India, Jainagar had a total population of 8,389, of which 4,359 (52%) were males and 4,030 (48%) were females. Population in the age range 0–6 years was 1,416. The total number of literate persons in Jainagar  was 5,557 (79.69% of the population over 6 years).

Civic administration

Police station
Jainagar police station serves Jainagar CD block.

CD block HQ
Headquarters of Jainagar CD block is at Jainagar village.

Transport
There is a nearby station at Hirodih on the Asansol-Gaya section, a part of the Grand Chord, Howrah-Gaya-Delhi line and Howrah-Allahabad-Mumbai line.

References

Villages in Koderma district